USS SC-255, sometimes styled as either Submarine Chaser No. 255 or S.C.-255, was an  built for the United States Navy during World War I. Like most members of her class, she was not named and known only by her designation.

SC-255 was built at George Lawley & Sons in Neponset, Massachusetts in 1917. She was commissioned 19 November 1917.

On 15 April 1918 SC-255 left Bermuda in a convoy with 29 other submarine chasers, four U.S. Navy tugs, two French tugs and destroyer tender . Cruiser  and armed yacht  performed escort duty for the convoy. On 24 April, SC-255 was taken under tow for a time by Bridgeport, and three days later, the convoy reached Ponta Delgada, Azores.

At some point in her career, SC-255 entered dry dock in Malta.

It is unclear if SC-255 remained in commission on 17 July 1920. If she were, she would have received, as part of the new U.S. Navy letter-number scheme, the hull designation of PC-255.

SC-255 was sold on 24 June 1921 to Joseph G. Hitner of Philadelphia. Her ultimate fate is unknown.

Notes

References

External links 
 Photo of SC-255 in dry dock in Malta.

 

SC-1-class submarine chasers
Ships built in Boston
World War I patrol vessels of the United States